Stelian Nicolae Cucu (born 15 September 1989) is a Romanian professional footballer who plays as a defender or midfielder for Sporting Liești.

Honours
Oțelul Galați
Liga III: 2020–21

References

External links
 
 

1989 births
Living people
People from Galați
Romanian footballers
Association football midfielders
Liga I players
Liga II players
Liga III players
FCM Dunărea Galați players
CS Concordia Chiajna players
ASC Oțelul Galați players
FC Botoșani players
FC Dunărea Călărași players
AFC Chindia Târgoviște players